The Naval General Service Medal (NGSM) was a campaign medal approved in 1847, for issue to officers and men of the Royal Navy.

The Admiralty retroactively awarded the Naval General Service Medal for various naval actions that occurred during the period 1793–1840, a period that included the French Revolutionary Wars, the Napoleonic Wars, and the Anglo–American War of 1812. When the Admiralty issued a medal, it bore one or more clasps on the ribbon, representing the specific battles or actions in which the recipient served. In all, the Admiralty authorised 231 clasps, though in ten cases all potential claimants had died prior to the authorisation of the medal, with the result that those clasps were never issued. The clasps covered a variety of actions, from boat service to single-ship actions, to larger naval engagements, including major fleet actions such as the Battle of Trafalgar.

In all, 20,933 medals were awarded, 15,577 with a single clasp.

Some discrepancies between the dates of the medals and actual actions are due to the Royal Navy's practice of dating, in which the day officially began at noon. Until 11 October 1805 (when the Admiralty ordered that "the calendar or civil day is to be made use of, beginning at midnight") ships' logs were kept in nautical time and written up at midday, so that a day's entry consisted of the proceedings for the afternoon of the day before and morning of that day. So, for example, an action that took place on the morning of 10 April, would be logged as occurring on 9 April.

The following is a list of all 231 clasps for this medal.

Clasps

French Revolutionary Wars (1793–1802)

Napoleonic Wars (1803–15)

War of 1812 (1812–15)

Later wars (1816, 1827, & 1840)

Boat service clasps
The boat service clasps commemorate a number of actions performed by boats' crews in cutting out, and in some instances actually recovering, British vessels lost to the enemy, or capturing enemy vessels. These clasps were approved for those occasions where an officer or senior rating received promotion as a direct consequence.

French Revolutionary Wars (1793–1802)

Napoleonic Wars (1803–15)

War of 1812 (1812–15)

Citations

References

External links

 
Naval General Service Medal Roll (1793–1840)
Some muster rolls, for ships involved in fleet actions 1794–1811, held at The National Archives, Kew

British campaign medals
British military medals of the Napoleonic Wars
Royal Navy lists
Decorations of the Royal Navy